Jichu Qullu (Aymara jichu ichhu (Peruvian feather grass), qullu mountain, "ichhu mountain", Hispanicized spelling Icho Ccollo) is a  mountain in the Andes of Peru. It is situated in the Moquegua Region, General Sanchez Cerro Province, in the districts Ichuña and Yunga. Jichu Qullu lies southwest of Wankarani and northwest of Machuyuq (Machuyoc) and Pachakutiq.

References

Mountains of Peru
Mountains of Moquegua Region